No sharps may refer to:
C major, a major musical key with no sharps
A minor, a minor musical key with no sharps